Joseph Langland (February 16, 1917 – April 9, 2007) was an American poet.

Life
Born in  Spring Grove, Minnesota, Langland was raised in Northeastern Iowa on the family farm. Langland received both a bachelor's degree (1940) and a master's degree (1941) from the University of Iowa. He served in the U.S. Army as an infantryman during World War II. His first collection of poems For Harold (1945) was written for his younger brother who was killed in action in the Philippines.

After the war, Langland taught part-time at the University of Iowa and then joined the faculty of University of Wyoming, teaching there from 1948 to 1959. He then moved to the University of Massachusetts Amherst, where he founded the MFA Program for Poets & Writers. He was a faculty member at UMass from 1959–1979 and a professor emeritus from 1979 until his death in 2007.

His work appeared in Massachusetts Review, Paris Review, The Nation, The New Yorker.

He married Judith Gail Wood on June 26, 1943. They had three children: Joseph Thomas Jr., (1946?); Elizabeth, (1948); and Paul (1951).
He died April 9, 2007 at his home in New Rochelle, New York at the age of 90.  His papers are held at Luther College in Iowa.

Works
 The Green Town (1956)
 The Wheel of Summer (1963)
 An Interview and Fourteen Poems (1973)
 
 Any Body’s Song, Doubleday, 1980 (National Poetry Series)
 A Dream of Love (A poem with etchings), Pleiades Press (1986)
 Twelve Preludes and Postludes (1988)

Editor

References

External links
Collection of Langland's papers at Luther College

1917 births
2007 deaths
American male poets
University of Iowa alumni
University of Iowa faculty
University of Wyoming faculty
University of Massachusetts Amherst faculty
People from Spring Grove, Minnesota
Writers from New Rochelle, New York
Military personnel from Minnesota
Poets from Minnesota
20th-century American poets
20th-century American male writers